Leadership Secrets of the Rogue Warrior: A Commando's Guide to Success is a book by United States Navy SEAL veteran Dick Marcinko, together with ghost writer John Weisman.  In the book, Marcinko looks into the world of business management. Loaded with examples, both military and civilian, the book aims to serve as a self-help guide for lower management to rise through the corporate ranks.

The book debuted at number 7 on the New York Times Business Best Seller list.

References

Business books
Self-help books
1996 non-fiction books
Pocket Books books